The Decatur Limestone is a geologic formation in Tennessee. It preserves fossils dating back to the Silurian period.

See also

 List of fossiliferous stratigraphic units in Tennessee
 Paleontology in Tennessee

References
 

Silurian geology of Tennessee
Silurian southern paleotemperate deposits